Country Code: +47 79 (partial)
International Call Prefix: 00
Trunk Prefix: none

Svalbard is a part of the Kingdom of Norway and is located in the Arctic Ocean.

Telephone numbers in Svalbard use Norway's country code.

Format: +47 79 XX XX XX

References

Svalbard
Svalbard-related lists